Slid may refer to:

 Slíd, one of the eleven rivers collectively known as the Élivágar in Norse mythology
 "Slid" (Fluke song), a 1993 electronica song
 Student League for Industrial Democracy (disambiguation)

See also

 Slide (disambiguation)